Paint It Black is a 1989 American thriller film directed by Tim Hunter and starring Rick Rossovich and Doug Savant.

Plot   
A California metal sculptor (Rick Rossovich) becomes a suspect after a serial killer (Doug Savant) kills his gallery-owner lover (Sally Kirkland).

Cast
 Rick Rossovich as Jonathan Dunbar
 Doug Savant as Eric Hinsley
 Julie Carmen as Gina Bayworth
 Sally Kirkland as Maria Easton
 Martin Landau as Daniel Lambert
 Peter Frechette as Gregory
 Jason Bernard as Lieutenant Wilder

Production
Original director Roger Holzberg left the film during shooting and was replaced by Tim Hunter who rewrote most of the script.

References

External links

1989 films
Films directed by Tim Hunter
1989 thriller films
American thriller films
1980s English-language films
1980s American films